Li Da (April 19, 1905 – July 12, 1993) was a general in the People's Liberation Army of China, former deputy of the PLA General Staff, as well as being an adviser to the Central Military Commission.

Biography

Early life
Xiao was born in Mei County, Shaanxi Province of China.

He joined the Sixth Army Group and participated the Encirclement Campaigns in 1930s. He joined the Chinese Communist Party in 1932 and participated in the Long March. He went to Jinggangshan and was recruited to the Red Fourth Army.

Military career
Between 1930–1933, he was appointed as first to command of the Third Army, and later Second Army Group, and later the Eighth Route Army, fighting in many battles consisting of the Nationalist Encirclement Campaigns till the Chinese Civil War. 

He died in Beijing on July 12, 1993.

References

1905 births
1993 deaths
People's Liberation Army generals from Shaanxi
People from Baoji
Deputy Ministers of National Defense of the People's Republic of China